"Everybody" is the debut single by American singer Madonna, released on October 6, 1982, under the label Sire Records. The single was featured on her debut studio album Madonna (1983). Madonna had recorded a demo of the song with Steve Bray. She urged DJ Mark Kamins, who DJed at Danceteria, to play it. He was impressed by the song and took her to Sire Records, who signed her for a two-song deal. However, after the recording of the two singles was over, Sire executive Michael Rosenblatt was not interested in the other song produced and decided to release only "Everybody".

By incorporating R&B-infused beats in the music and not including her image on the cover artwork, marketing for the song gave the impression that Madonna was a black artist. That impression did not last long as Madonna would later convince Sire executives to shoot a music video for the song. The low-budget video directed by Ed Steinberg showed Madonna and her friends in a club singing and dancing to the song. The video helped to further promote the song and Madonna as an artist.

The song charted on the Billboard Hot Dance Club Songs, and helped Madonna achieve her first appearance on a chart. She has performed "Everybody" live a number of times. It was first performed during the Virgin Tour, it was part of the intro music for the dancers in the Blond Ambition Tour then as the final song of the Girlie Show World Tour, later on the MDNA Tour and most recently on the Rebel Heart Tour. She also performed it in her Coachella appearance in 2006. The song was included in a remixed form on Madonna's albums You Can Dance (1987) and Finally Enough Love: 50 Number Ones (2022), as well as on the deluxe edition of her 2009 compilation album, Celebration.

Background and recording 
In 1979, Madonna was living in New York and establishing her music career as a member of rock band the Breakfast Club with her boyfriend Dan Gilroy. In late 1980, she was joined by Stephen Bray, her boyfriend from Michigan, who became the drummer of the band. Shortly after, Madonna and Bray left the Breakfast Club and formed the band Emmy and the Emmys. The two began writing songs together and they recorded a four-song demo tape in November 1980, but soon after, Madonna decided to promote herself as a solo artist. In 1981, Madonna signed to a music management company called Gotham Records. During that time, Madonna had written and developed some songs on her own. She carried rough tapes of three of the songs, "Everybody", "Ain't No Big Deal" and "Burning Up". She frequented nightclubs such as Danceteria where she convinced DJ Mark Kamins to play "Everybody" in 1982. The song was received positively by the crowd, and Kamins decided to help Madonna get a record deal. Kamins, who also worked as an A&R man for Island Records, played her demo tape for the label's founder Chris Blackwell, but Blackwell didn't want to sign her so Kamins sent it to Sire Records. The President of Sire, Seymour Stein, was impressed by her demo and he met Madonna while he was admitted to Lenox Hill Hospital. Madonna was ultimately signed a deal for a total of three singles with an option for an album. She was offered $15,000 per single and there was an additional publishing deal by which she'd get a $2,500 advance for every song she wrote. Michael Rosenblatt, who worked at the A&R department of Sire, commented:
"Madonna is great. She will do anything to be a star, and that's exactly what I look for in an artist: total co-operation... With Madonna, I knew I had someone hot and co-operative, so I planned to build her career with singles, rather than just put an album right away and run the risk of disaster."
The 12-inch version of "Everybody" was produced by Mark Kamins at Bob Blank's Blank Tapes Studio in New York City. Kamins was romantically involved with Madonna at that time and he took over the production work from Stephen Bray. The new recording ran 5:56 on one side and 9:23 for the dub version on the flipside. Madonna and Kamins had to record the single at their own cost. Arthur Baker, friend of Mark Kamins, guided him through the role of a music producer and provided him with studio musician Fred Zarr who performed keyboard on the track. Zarr became one of the common musical threads on the album by eventually performing on every track. Due to the restrained budget, the recording was a hefty affair as Madonna could not understand Kamins' directions and Kamins himself faced problems directing. Rosenblatt wanted to release "Everybody" with "Ain't No Big Deal" on the other side, but later changed his mind and put "Everybody" on both sides of the vinyl record after hearing the recorded version of "Ain't No Big Deal".

Release and composition 

"Everybody" was commercially released as Madonna's first single on October 6, 1982, and came with a Lou Beach-designed sleeve depicting a hip hop–style NYC street scene. Because of the ambiguous nature of the record sleeve and the R&B groove of the song, Madonna was widely believed to be a black artist when the single was released. According to Matthew Lindsay of The Quietus, it was ironic that the record sleeve did not depict Madonna on the cover, as she would become "the face of the 80s."

"Everybody" was recorded at Sigma Sound Studios in New York City. The track starts with a heavily synthesized and spoken introduction with Madonna taking a loud intake of breath. She also displayed her bubblegum pop voice in the song, which was doubletracked. The song is written in the key of A minor with the melody of the song beginning in G and rising to the second scale degree on the syllable 'bo' of 'everybody', thus highlighting the chorus which follows in the chord progression of G–A–B–A. Sonically, it is a post-disco and dance song which incorporates R&B-infused beats. Sire Records marketed the soulful nature of the dance song for the black audience and Madonna was promoted as an African-American artist, thereby fitting the record into a radio playlist where the song might chart. In New York, the song was played on 92 KTU which had an African-American audience.

Reception

Critical response 

Author Rikky Rooksby, in his book The Complete Guide to the Music of Madonna, noted that the song closed the Madonna album on a flat note. He called the music artificial, repetitive and uninspired. Don Shewey from Rolling Stone commented that "At first, it ["Everybody"] doesn't sound like much at all. Then you notice its one distinguishing feature, a girlish hiccup that the singer uses over and over until it's irritating as hell. Finally, you get hooked, and you start looking forward to that silly little catch in her voice." Author J. Randy Taraborrelli in his biography on Madonna commented that the song was a rhythmic call to party.

Author Santiago Fouz-Hernández in his book Madonna's Drowned Worlds, complimented the chorus of the song, saying that "Everybody" and "Music" are the two Madonna singles which define her artistic credo – that music has the power to overcome divisions of race, gender, and sexuality. Matthew Lindsay of The Quietus praised the song, calling it "spectacular" and "hard to resist." Lindsay added "with its breathy spoken word passages and invitation to dance, Madonna's debut single was a template that would be revisited throughout her career." In 2012 Louis Virtel of The Backlot listed "Everybody" at number two on his list of "100 Greatest Madonna Songs," commenting that the song is an example of Madonna's undeniable talents. Virtel goes on to say through the song Madonna shows she is "a commander, the Baryshnikov of pop chutzpah, and a rightful disco empress." In 2006, Slant Magazine ranked as the 18th greatest dance song of all time.

Commercial performance 
The 12-inch single of "Everybody" failed to chart on the Billboard Hot 100 in the United States. It peaked at number 7 on Billboards Bubbling Under Hot 100 Singles chart on January 22, 1983. However the song moved quickly up the dance charts, and was Madonna's first single to chart on the Billboard Hot Dance/Club Play Chart, peaking at number three. One of the first radio stations to embrace the song was WKTU, which reported it as a new "Playlist Top Add On" in the December 11, 1982, issue of Billboard, reflecting their station's playlist for the week ending November 30, 1982. By September 1983, "Everybody" sold 150,000 units in the United States according to Radio & Records. Since its release, the single has sold around 250,000 copies. The song helped Madonna achieve a first magazine cover photograph. In the December 1982 issue of Dance Music Report magazine, Madonna and another band, Jekyll and Hyde, were nominated for awards in the sales category of a reader's poll. It was Madonna's picture that appeared on the cover.

Music video 

Sire Records had marketed the "Everybody" single as if Madonna was a black artist. This misconception was cleared by the release of the music video for the song. Regarding the importance of shooting a music video for the song, Madonna commented that, "If I didn't have a video, I don't think all the kids in the Midwest would know about me. It takes the place of touring. Everybody sees them everywhere. That really has a lot to do with the success of my album." She invited Sire Records executives, including Stein and Rosenblatt, to the New York nightclub Danceteria. She performed "Everybody" on the dancefloor, wearing a top hat and tails. On the night of the performance, Madonna's friend Haoui Montaug introduced her to the 300 strong audience. Cheered by them, Madonna and her dancers performed their choreographed dance moves, later described as a 'disco act backed by avant-garde dancers.' Seeing the performance, they also realised that Madonna appeared visually stunning. They ordered an in-house video of "Everybody" to be sent to the clubs around the country which used dance videos.

Rosenblatt contacted Ed Steinberg, who ran the Rock America video company and asked him if he could spare a few hours to make a music video for "Everybody" with Madonna on stage at her next performance in Danceteria. The idea was to play the video as promotion across the United States so that people will come to recognize an image of Madonna and her performance. Rosenblatt offered Steinberg $1,000 for the in-house production video, when artists like Duran Duran and Michael Jackson were spending six figure sums on videos. They finally agreed on $1,500. With the low-budget the video was directed by Steinberg, who suggested filming on location at the Paradise Garage, a downtown gay disco, instead of recording a live performance. Madonna's friend Debi Mazar did the makeup and joined her other backup dancers, namely Erika Belle and Bags Rilez. Mazar brought a few of her friends to act as a disco crowd in the video, including graffiti artist Michael Stewart, who was killed in act of police brutality the following year. Steinberg was impressed by Madonna's professionalism on the set and he helped to send copies of the tape to nightclubs across America which used to play dance music videos for their entertainment. This promotion helped the song to grow from being a dance hit in New York to a nationwide hit.

The video starts with Madonna and her two backup dancers dancing in a club while lights blink in the background. The shots continue while interspersing close-up shots of Madonna dancing while wearing a coat and junk jewelry. Author Douglas Kellner in his book Media Culture: Cultural Studies, Identity, and Politics Between the Modern and the Postmodern noted that already with her first video, Madonna was deploying fashion, sexuality and the construction of an individual image to present herself both as an alluring sex object and as a transgressor of established norms. Downtown artist Fab Five Freddy reminisced that with the video Madonna "is attracting those who were more street, more savvy, more flavorful."

Live performances 

In order to promote "Everybody," Madonna first performed the single at Danceteria in New York City, as part of  Haoui Montaug's No Entiendes cabaret revue on December 16, 1982. Madonna and her backup dancers—Martin Burgoyne, Erika Belle and Bags Rilez—wore plaid golf shorts, a white shirt underneath an oversized black blazer, and a hat. She made her first television appearance performing "Everybody" on Dancin' on Air in January 1983. In February 1983, she promoted the single at nightclubs in the United Kingdom, including Heaven and Camden Palace in London, and the Haçienda in Manchester. Throughout 1983 and 1984, she continued performing the track during promotional one-off gigs at nightclubs.

While performing the song for the Virgin Tour in 1985, Madonna wore a blue see-through crop-top which revealed her black bra, a purple skirt, lacy leggings and a brightly patterned jacket. She also wore crucifixes in her hair, and on her ears and neck. As the performance of "Into the Groove" ended, Madonna took the microphone and danced around the stage while singing "Everybody". The performance was included in the home video release titled Madonna Live: The Virgin Tour. Madonna sampled line, "Dance and sing, get up and do your thing" from "Everybody" during the opening bars of "Express Yourself" for the Blond Ambition World Tour.

For the Girlie Show World Tour (1993), "Everybody" was performed as the closing song of the tour. Madonna wore pale shorts and a simple yellow and green V-necked shirt, which she hitched up into a bra revealing top. The performance started off after "Justify My Love". The beginning contained the chorus from "Everybody Is a Star" originally by Sly & The Family Stone. As the song progressed, musical excerpts of "Dance to the Music", "After the Dance" and "It Takes Two" were included. Jon Pareles from The New York Times complimented the performance, saying "the show's finale is downright wholesome, with the troupe in denim and white tops, inviting the audience to dance to 'Everybody'. It's just a good-time song-and-dance revue, not a provocation."

Madonna played the song during the Coachella Valley Music and Arts Festival while promoting her tenth studio album Confessions on a Dance Floor (2005). She performed the song wearing a tank top and high boots, with a silver glitter band around her hair. It was also performed at London's Koko Club where the singer was dressed in an all-purple ensemble of jacket, velvet pedal pushers and knee-high boots. Before performing "Everybody", she announced that, "I feel like I'm really out of shape right now, I don't like falling off horses, so I'm going to do one more song."

On October 6, 2012, Madonna performed "Everybody" during the MDNA Tour in San Jose to celebrate the single's 30th anniversary. She said, "Today is a very special day for me. It is the 30th anniversary of the release of my first-ever single. I remember the amazing feeling I had when I heard the song on the radio the first time." Aidin Vaziri from San Francisco Chronicle commented that "Three decades later, the simple synth-pop lift and naive R&B melody still felt amazing. It was an off-script moment that inadvertently became the highlight of the show."

In 2015, "Everybody" was included in the set list of the first few dates of the Rebel Heart Tour, performed in a flamenco-style medley with "Dress You Up", "Into the Groove" and "Lucky Star". During the sequence the singer dressed by in a Latin and gypsy inspired dress, created by Alessandro Michele for Gucci consisting off a shawl, flamenco hat, lace, skirts and jacquard bodysuit.

Track listing and formats 

US / FRA 12" Single
 "Everybody" (Extended Version) – 5:56
 "Everybody" (Dub Version) – 9:23

US / GER / FRA / BEL 7" Single / Digital download
"Everybody" (7" Edit) – 3:58
"Everybody" (Instrumental Version) – 4:13

UK / ITA 12" Single
 "Everybody" (Remix) – 6:16
 "Everybody" (Dub Version) – 5:59

UK / ITA 7" Single
 "Everybody" (7" Remix) – 3:20
 "Everybody" (Dub Version) – 4:40

German CD Single
"Everybody" (LP Version) – 4:55
"Everybody" (Dub Version) – 8:58

UK / German CD maxi single
 "Everybody" (LP Version) – 4:55
 "Everybody" (Dub Version) – 8:58

Notes: Releases with the (Dub Version) listed at 9:23 are all misprints; actual time is 8:58.

Notes: The UK / ITA 7" and 12" Singles are by Rusty Egan and Steve Short at Trident Studios Reduction Suite, U.K. and Italy only

Credits and personnel 
Credits adapted from the 7-inch single liner notes.

Madonna – vocals, writer
Mark Kamins – producer
Butch Jones – synthesizer, engineering
Reggie Lucas – guitar, drum programming
Fred Zarr – synthesizer, electric and acoustic piano
Dean Gant – electric and acoustic piano
Bobby Malach – tenor saxophone
Ed Walsh – synthesizer
Gwen Guthrie – background vocals
Brenda White – background vocals
Chrissy Faith – background vocals
Christine Sauers – art direction, design
Lou Beach – artwork

Charts

Weekly charts

Year-end charts

References

Bibliography

External links 
 

1982 songs
1982 debut singles
Madonna songs
Post-disco songs
American dance songs
Songs written by Madonna
Songs about dancing
Song recordings produced by Mark Kamins